Thunder Knoll  is a reef knoll about 18 km in extent and composed of coral sand. It lies approximately 6 km west of the north part of Rosalind Bank. Depths over this bank range from 11 to 27 m.

External links
Sailing Directions, Caribbean Sea, Vol. II

Landforms of the Caribbean
Geography of the Caribbean